Ali Özen (born 18 July 1971) is a Turkish wrestler. He competed in the men's freestyle 85 kg at the 2000 Summer Olympics.

References

External links
 

1971 births
Living people
Turkish male sport wrestlers
Olympic wrestlers of Turkey
Wrestlers at the 2000 Summer Olympics
Place of birth missing (living people)